Albeni is a commune in Gorj County, Oltenia, Romania. It is composed of six villages: Albeni, Bârzeiu de Gilort, Bolbocești, Doseni, Mirosloveni and Prunești.

References

Communes in Gorj County
Localities in Oltenia